Star Base Football Club is a Nigerian football club based in Ogudu, Lagos, that was founded in September 2014 by Adeoye Segun Hakeem.

History 

Star Base Football Club was founded in 2014 when founder and president of the team, Mr Adeoye Segun Hakeem, decided to bring together some of the best young talents at the Ori-oke Mobile Police Barrack football pitch in Ogudu Lagos to form a professional team.

Adeoye usually played weekend football with an 'all star' team, Alapere Mopol FC at the Ori-oke Mobile Police Barrack, Ogudu Lagos and was left impressed by some of the boys that played with him in the all star team and after them.

Convinced of their talents, Adeoye spoke to the youngsters about turning their love for the game into something that can earn them a living professionally. So he assembled them and named the team Star Base Football Club, Ogudu.

Star Base participate in the Fusion Football Championship, a Lagos State FA approved League.

Current squad
As of January 2022

Coaching staff

Management

Notable players
Robert Odu

References

Lagos
Football clubs in Lagos
Association football clubs established in 2014
2014 establishments in Nigeria